The 76th Infantry Division was a unit of the United States Army in World War I, World War II and the Cold War.  The division was inactivated in 1996 and has been reconstituted as the 76th US Army Reserve Operational Response Command in 2013.

World War I
Activated: August 1917 at Camp Devens, Massachusetts 
Overseas: August 1918
Commanders: Maj. Gen. H. F. Hodges (5 August 1917), Brig. Gen. William Weigel (28 November 1917), Maj. Gen. H. F. Hodges (13 February 1918)
Inactivated: May 1919

Order of battle

 Headquarters, 76th Division
 151st Infantry Brigade
 301st Infantry Regiment
 302nd Infantry Regiment 
 302nd Machine Gun Battalion
 152nd Infantry Brigade
 303rd Infantry Regiment
 304th Infantry Regiment 
 303rd Machine Gun Battalion
 151st Field Artillery Brigade
 301st Field Artillery Regiment (75 mm)
 302nd Field Artillery Regiment (4.7 inch)
 303rd Field Artillery Regiment (155 mm)
 301st Trench Mortar Battery
 301st Machine Gun Battalion
 301st Engineer Regiment
 301st Field Signal Battalion
 Headquarters Troop, 76th Division
 301st Train Headquarters and Military Police
 301st Ammunition Train
 301st Supply Train
 301st Engineer Train
 301st Sanitary Train
 301st, 302nd, 303rd, and 304th Ambulance Companies and Field Hospitals

Depot division

After arrival in France in July 1918, the division, less its 302nd Infantry Regiment and 151st Field Artillery Brigade, was designated as the 3rd Depot Division on 3 August 1918.   Most of its troops were used as replacements for front line units which reduced the division to 7,000 troops.  The division was skeletonized on 7 November 1918 - four days before the Armistice.

Interwar period

The division was reconstituted in the Organized Reserve on 24 June 1921 and assigned to the states of Connecticut and Rhode Island. The headquarters was organized on 1 September 1921.

World War II
Ordered into active military service: 15 June 1942 at Fort George G. Meade, Maryland
Overseas: 10 December 1944
Campaigns: Ardennes-Alsace, Rhineland, Central Europe
Days of combat: 107
Distinguished Unit Citations: 2
Awards: MH-2 ; DSC-11 ; DSM-1 ; SS-176; LM-5; SM19 ; BSM-1,312 ; AM-58
Commanders: Maj. Gen. Emil F. Reinhardt (June–December 1942), Maj. Gen. William R. Schmidt (December 1942 – July 1945), Brig. Gen. Henry C. Evans (August 1945 to inactivation)
Inactivated: 31 August 1945 in Europe

Training and activation

Order of battle

 Headquarters, 76th Infantry Division
 304th Infantry Regiment
 385th Infantry Regiment
 417th Infantry Regiment
 Headquarters and Headquarters Battery, 76th Infantry Division Artillery
 302nd Field Artillery Battalion (105 mm)
 355th Field Artillery Battalion (105 mm)
 364th Field Artillery Battalion (155 mm
901st<Kenneth  Holland, WW2 member of unit> Field Artillery Battalion (105&155 mm)
 301st Engineer Combat Battalion
 301st Medical Battalion
 76th Cavalry Reconnaissance Troop (Mechanized)
 Headquarters, Special Troops, 76th Infantry Division
 Headquarters Company, 76th Infantry Division
 776th Ordnance Light Maintenance Company
 76th Quartermaster Company
 76th Signal Company
 Military Police Platoon
 Band
 76th Counterintelligence Corps Detachment

Intensive training began on 12 April 1943. This was followed by advanced training in July 1943 at A.P. Hill Military Reservation near Fredericksburg, Virginia. Winter training started in September 1943 at Camp McCoy in Wisconsin. (Skis, snowshoes, toboggans, snow tractors, snow goggles, winter camouflage suits, Eskimo parkas, etc.) Simultaneously, advanced training group moved in November 1943 to Northern Michigan near Watersmeet. Winter training experts from Mountaining Training Center at Camp Hale, Colorado gave special training program. Additional winter training began at Ottawa National Forest near Watersmeet, Michigan on 19 February 1944.

Four exercises were conducted during which the 385th Infantry Regiment (headquartered in Pori, Michigan, opposed the division as an enemy force.

On 12 March 1944, the division returned to Camp McCoy.  7,000 troops were taken from the 76th to build up forces for the impending invasion of France (D-Day) during April 1944.

In November 1944, trains headed to Camp Myles Standish in Taunton, Massachusetts for staging before transport to Europe.  On Thanksgiving Day 1944, three transports sailed from Boston Port of Embarkation to Europe.

The 304th Infantry plus a Division Headquarters party sailed on the SS Brazil. The 304th reached Southampton, England on 4 December 1944.

The 385th Infantry crossed the Atlantic on the SS Sea Owl. The 385th reached Southampton on 4 December 1944.

The 417th Infantry sailed on the SS Marine Raven. The 417th docked at Plymouth 4 December 1944.

The remainder of the division sailed from Boston on 10 December 1944 aboard the Coast Guard operated transport SS Richardson. The SS Richardson docked at the Clyde River near Grenoch, Scotland on 12 December 1944.

The remainder of the Division Headquarters sailed from New York on 4 December on the Dutch liner New Amsterdam.

Combat chronicle
The 76th Infantry Division arrived in England, 20 December 1944, where it received additional training. It landed at Le Havre, France, 12 January 1945, and proceeded to the Limesy concentration area. The Division moved to Beine east of Reims and then to Champlon, Belgium, 23 January, to prepare for combat. Relieving the 87th Division in defensive positions along the Sauer and Moselle Rivers in the vicinity of Echternach, Luxembourg, 25 January, the 76th sent out patrols and crossed the Sauer, 7 February, and breached the Siegfried Line in a heavy assault. The advance continued across the Prum and Nims Rivers, 25–27 February. Katzenkopf fortress and Irrel fell on 28 February and the attack pushed on toward Trier, reaching the Moselle, 3 March. Driving across the Kyll River, the division took Hosten, 3 March, Speicher on 5 March and Karl on 10 March; swung south and cleared the area north of the Moselle, crossing the river, 18 March, near Mülheim an der Mosel. Moving to the Rhine, the 76th took over defenses from Boppard to St. Goar and crossed the Rhine at Boppard, 27 March. It drove east and took Kamberg in a house-to-house struggle, 29 March. A new attack was launched 4 April and the Werra River was reached the next day. The attack continued in conjunction with the 6th Armored Division; Langensalza fell and the Gera River was crossed, 11 April. Zeitz was captured after a violent struggle, 14–15 April, and the 76th reached the Mulde River on 16 April, going into defensive positions to hold a bridgehead across the Mulde near Chemnitz until VE-day.

Casualties
Total battle casualties: 2,395
Killed in action: 433
Wounded in action: 1,811
Missing in action: 10
Prisoner of war: 141

Awards
Medal of Honor:
Pvt. William D. McGee (Posthumously) 304th Infantry
Pfc. Herman C. Wallace (Posth.) 301st Engineer Combat Battalion

Distinguished Service Cross:
Capt. Robert Bertsch (Posth.)
S/Sgt. Fred H. Brown (Posth.)
1st Lt. Clyde W. Ehrhardt
Pvt. M. J. Fortuna (Posth.)
1st Lt. F. Gerard, Jr. (Posth.)
2nd Lt. Myron A. Mears
T/5 Edgar Pelletier
S/Sgt. Jacob M. Peter (Posth.)
Sgt. Vito C. Pumilia
Pfc. L. W. Satterfield (Posth.)
Pfc. W. H. Shorey (Posth.)
S/Sgt. Edward M. Transue (Posth.)
S/Sgt. A. D. Webber (Posth.)

Legion of Merit:
Col. George E. Bruner
Col. W. A. Choquette
Col. Meade J. Dugas
Brig. Gen. Henry C. Evans
Col. Chifford J. Mathews
Col. W. W. O'Conner
Maj. Gen. William R. Schmidt
Brig. Gen. Francis A. Woolfley
CWO Raymond J. Dutra

Assignments in ETO
9 January 1945: 12th Army Group
14 January 1945: Fifteenth Army, 12th Army Group
19 January 1945: VIII Corps, Third Army, 12th Army Group
25 January 1945: XII Corps
3 April 1945: XX Corps
8 April 1945: VIII Corps
22 April 1945: VIII Corps, First Army, 12th Army Group
11 May 1945: VIII Corps, Ninth Army, 12th Army Group

Cold War to 1996
The 76th Division was reconstituted in October 1946 and reactivated in November of that year as a part of the Organized Reserve, and was headquartered in West Hartford, Connecticut.  Units of the division were spread throughout the six New England states.

For the next 13 years, the division served as a traditional line Infantry division, training annually at Camp Edwards, Massachusetts and at Pine Camp (now Fort Drum), New York.  In May 1959, the Division was re-designated and reorganized as the 76th Division (Training) with the mission of training initial (basic) entry soldiers of various branches and in later years the division also became able to train infantry volunteers or draftees.

In this role during 1985 and 1986, in an operation codenamed "Onaway Eagle", the division successfully defined, established and executed the first USAR (United States Army Reserve) mobilization army training center at Fort Campbell, Kentucky which became the model for utilization and employment of other reserve training divisions in the United States Army. In Operation Onaway Eagle, elements of the division successfully conducted Basic Combat Training for hundreds of new soldiers.

In 1990–1991, during Desert Shield and Desert Storm, the division validated and deployed to the Middle East over 600 of its soldiers where they served with distinction with the Third Army. As part of Operations Desert Shield and Desert Storm, the 1205th Transportation Railway Services Unit (later 1205th Transportation Railway Operating Battalion), based in Middletown, CT, was mobilized to augment civilian railway employees at Military Ocean Terminal Sunny Point, a U.S. Army munitions outport located just south of Wilmington, NC, bringing in tons of explosives by rail to the secure port for shipment to the war zone. On 1 October 1994, the division was again redesignated and on 18 April 1995 was reorganized as the 76th Division (Institutional Training). Just over two years later, the division was inactivated on 15 November 1996 at West Hartford, Connecticut. The commander at the time was BG John G Pappas, who served in this position from 1 Oct 1994 until 9 Sept 1996.

Reactivation in 2013 to present
In February 2013, Major General Daniel York sought a historical designation for a new command being stood up in the Army Reserve.  The 76th Division was reactivated as the 76th USAR Operational Response Command (ORC) and is headquartered in Salt Lake City, Utah.  Their mission is to provide operational engagement packages and joint enabling capabilities for homeland response, cyber defense, legal support, information operations, and global force space enhancement requirements to combatant, unified, Joint and Department of Defense Agency Commanders.

From October 2015 to September 2017, Major General Ricky L. Waddell served as commanding general of the 76th Operational Response Command.

From November 2017 to June 2018, Major General A.C. Roper served as commanding general of the 76th Operational Response Command.

From June 2018 to July 2019, Brigadier General Douglas A. Cherry served as acting commanding general of the 76th Operational Response Command.

From July 2019 to March 2020, Major General Frederick R. Maiocco served as commanding general.

From March 2020 to August 2020, Brigadier General Douglas A. Cherry served as acting commanding general.

Major General Miles Davis is the current commanding general.

The command is made up of over 6,000 soldiers with a presence in all 50 states, the District of Columbia, Puerto Rico, the US Virgin Islands, and select locations in Europe.

Current composition 
The current 76thORC is organised as follows:

 76th Operational Response Command, in Salt Lake City, Utah
 Emergency Preparedness Liaison Office
 HQ United States Army Reserve Elements and Augmentations
 FORSCOM Augmentation Unit
 Task Force 76
 3rd Army Augmentation Company
 1st Space Brigade
 3rd Space Company
 4th Space Company
 5th Space Company
 209th Regional Support Group
 450th Chemical Battalion
 453rd Chemical Battalion
 468th Chemical Battalion
 472nd Chemical Battalion
 415th Chemical Brigade, in Greenville, South Carolina
 92nd Chemical Battalion
 457th Chemical Battalion
 485th Chemical Battalion
 490th Chemical Battalion
 United States Army Reserve Chemical Command
 20th Support Chemical Detachment
 455th Chemical Brigade, in Sloan, Nevada (reactivated in 2019)
 451st Chemical Battalion (Provisional), at Fort Dix, New Jersey
 479th Chemical Battalion, at Fort Tilden, New York
 462nd Transportation Battalion, in Trenton, New Jersey
 x2 Army Reserve Elements

General
Nickname: Onaway Division; formerly called "Liberty Bell Division."
Shoulder patch: An escutcheon with a red field and a blue chief, separated by an olive drab line; a three-pronged white device is superimposed on the blue chief.
Battle Cry: "ONAWAY"   –  The "alert" signal of the Chippewa Indian warriors upon whose ground the 76th Division had trained.

References 

The Army Almanac: A Book of Facts Concerning the Army of the United States U.S. Government Printing Office, 1950 at http://www.history.army.mil/html/forcestruc/cbtchron/cbtchron.html
We Ripened Fast – The Unofficial History of the Seventy-Sixth Infantry Division Edited by 1st Lt Joseph J. Hutnick, ADC and Tec4 Leonard Kobrick.

External links
Fact Sheet of the 76th Infantry Division at http://www.battleofthebulge.org

076th Infantry Division, U.S.
Infantry Division, U.S. 076
Military units and formations established in 1917
Military in Connecticut
Training divisions of the United States Army
United States Army divisions of World War I